The 1978 New York Mets season was the 17th regular season for the Mets, who played their home games at Shea Stadium. Led by manager Joe Torre, the team had a 66–96 record and finished in sixth place in the National League East.

Offseason
 November 21, 1977: Tom Hausman was signed by the Mets as a free agent.
 November 30, 1977: Elliott Maddox was signed by the Mets as a free agent.
 December 6, 1977: Kevin Kobel was purchased by the Mets from the Milwaukee Brewers.
 December 7, 1977: Tim Foli was purchased by the Mets from the San Francisco Giants.
 December 8, 1977: In an unusual four team trade, the Atlanta Braves sent Willie Montañez to the Mets, the Texas Rangers sent Adrian Devine, Tommy Boggs and Eddie Miller to the Braves; Tom Grieve and a player to be named later to the Mets, and Bert Blyleven to the Pittsburgh Pirates. The Pirates sent Al Oliver and Nelson Norman to the Rangers, and the Mets sent Jon Matlack to the Rangers and John Milner to the Pirates. The Rangers later sent Ken Henderson to the Mets to complete the trade (March 15, 1978).
 December 9, 1977: Roy Staiger was traded by the Mets to the New York Yankees for Sergio Ferrer.
 January 10, 1978: Ricky Jones was drafted by the Mets in the 5th round of the 1978 Major League Baseball Draft, but did not sign.
 March 26, 1978: Mike Vail was claimed on waivers from the Mets by the Cleveland Indians.
 April 5, 1978: Butch Metzger claimed on waivers by the Mets from the St. Louis Cardinals.

Regular season 
On May 1, in a game against the Mets, Atlanta Braves manager Bobby Cox was ejected from a game for the first time in his career. Cox would go on to set the record for most ejections by a manager.

On June 16, in his 12th major league season speckled with near-misses, Tom Seaver, now of the Cincinnati Reds, finally hurls a no-hitter. The Cardinals are the 4–0 victims as Seaver strikes out 3 batters.

Season summary 
Expectations were low for the Mets heading into the 1978 season. The Amazin's only drew 11,736 for the season opener at Shea, which had acquired the nickname "Grant's Tomb." The Mets beat the Montreal Expos 3–1. Opening Day starter Jerry Koosman struck out seven in his complete game victory.

From there, things went poorly for Koosman and the Mets. He only won two more games with the Mets in 1978, versus 15 losses despite a respectable 3.75 earned run average. His third win of the season came on July 13 in Cincinnati against Tom Seaver. Following the season, Koosman would be traded to the Minnesota Twins for Jesse Orosco and Greg Field. Koosman had gone 11–35 in his last two seasons as a Met, bringing his career mark to 140–137—not nearly indicative of the stellar career he had with the Mets.

The ace of the staff turned out to be Pat Zachry, whom they'd acquired on June 15, 1977, as part of the infamous "Midnight Massacre", when he, Doug Flynn, Dan Norman and Steve Henderson were traded to the Mets from the Reds for Seaver.
 
Zachry had a 10–4 record, and was selected by Tommy Lasorda as the sole Mets representative on the National League All-Star team, but did not play. After dropping his next two decisions, On July 24, Zachry was the starting pitcher against the Cincinnati Reds for the largest crowd of the season at Shea (35,939) as Pete Rose entered the game with a 36-game hitting streak. Rose was 0–3 until a seventh inning single gave him a 37-game hitting streak to tie the N.L. record. Four batters latter, Zachry was pulled in favor of Kevin Kobel. Frustrated, Zachry went to kick a batting helmet sitting on the dugout steps, missed the helmet and kicked the step—fracturing his left foot, and ending his season. In his absence, Craig Swan assumed the role of staff ace. Swan went 7–1 following the injury to Zachry, leading the National League with a 2.43 ERA for the season.

With his hard, physical play, catcher John Stearns emerged as a Mets fan favorite for a team with desperately few stars. On April 8, he triggered a bench-clearing brawl by running into Montreal Expos catcher Gary Carter at the plate. On June 30, Stearns defeated the Pittsburgh Pirates by tagging out Dave Parker to end the game. Parker, who had run over two other catchers in the previous two weeks, suffered a broken cheekbone in the collision with Stearns. When the Pirates in-state rivals (also the Mets' own division rivals), the Philadelphia Phillies, next came to New York, they thanked Stearns for standing up to Parker. Stearns also led the Mets in stolen bases with 25, and in the process broke the National League record for catchers, which had been held by Johnny Kling since 1902.

Season standings

Record vs. opponents

Opening Day lineup 
Lenny Randle 3B
Tim Foli SS
Steve Henderson LF
Willie Montañez 1B
Ken Henderson RF
Lee Mazzilli CF
John Stearns C
Doug Flynn 2B
Jerry Koosman P

Notable transactions 
 May 19, 1978: Ken Henderson was traded by the Mets to the Cincinnati Reds for Dale Murray.
 June 6, 1978: 1978 Major League Baseball Draft
Hubie Brooks was drafted in the 1st round (3rd overall) by the Mets.
Brian Giles was drafted in the 3rd round by the Mets.
Mike Fitzgerald was drafted in the fifth round by the Mets.
Mark Davis was drafted by the Mets in the 22nd round, but did not sign.
Rick Anderson was drafted by the New York Mets in the 24th round of the 1978 amateur draft. 
 July 4, 1978: Butch Metzger was purchased from the Mets by the Philadelphia Phillies.
 July 28, 1978: Gil Flores was claimed on waivers by the Mets from the California Angels.

Roster

Player stats

Batting

Starters by position 
Note: Pos = Position; G = Games played; AB = At bats; H = Hits; Avg. = Batting average; HR = Home runs; RBI = Runs batted in

Other batters
Note: G = Games played; AB = At bats; H = Hits; Avg. = Batting average; HR = Home runs; RBI = Runs batted in

Pitching

Starting pitchers 
Note: G = Games pitched; IP = Innings pitched; W = Wins; L = Losses; ERA = Earned run average; SO = Strikeouts

Other pitchers 
Note: G = Games pitched; IP = Innings pitched; W = Wins; L = Losses; ERA = Earned run average; SO = Strikeouts

Relief pitchers 
Note: G = Games pitched; W = Wins; L = Losses; SV = Saves; ERA = Earned run average; SO = Strikeouts

Farm system

LEAGUE CHAMPIONS: Lynchburg

Notes

References

External links

1978 New York Mets at Baseball Reference
1978 New York Mets team page at www.baseball-almanac.com

New York Mets seasons
New York Mets season
New York
1970s in Queens